Pont-à-Mousson is a commune in the Meurthe-et-Moselle department in north-eastern France. Its inhabitants are known as Mussipontains in French. It is an industrial town (mainly steel industry), situated on the river Moselle. Pont-à-Mousson has several historical monuments, including the 18th century Premonstratensian abbey.

Demographics
In 2018, 14,434 people lived in the town, while its agglomeration had a population of 23,824.

History

Early Modern
In 1572 Cardinal Charles of Lorraine established a Jesuit university at Pont-à-Mousson.   With the Protestant Revolution building in the German-speaking lands, still part of the Holy Roman Empire, directly to the east, and the Duchy of Lorraine vulnerable to pressure from an increasingly assertive French state directly to the west, the Duchy participated in the wars of religion on the side of the Counter-Reformation.  The Tridentine strategy promulgated by the Holy See involved the creation of a "Roman Catholic backbone" (sometimes termed the Lotharingian axis from the territories, including Lorraine, between France and the Habsburg Empire).

During the seventeenth century the university grew rapidly until there were about 2,000 students.   There were four faculties covering theology, the arts, law and medicine.   Students were drawn from across western and central Europe.   Over time a rivalry grew up between students in the St Martin district, located on the right-bank of the river Moselle and dominated by Jesuits, and the left-bank students based in the St Laurent quarter and considered the rowdier of the two student tribes.   Rivalry peaked with the violent "printers' battles" when the rival factions were known respectively as the "Ponti Mussoni" and the "Mussiponti".   The "Mussiponti" won, and in the region the inhabitants of the town became known thereafter as "Mussipontains/Mussipontines".

18th and 19th centuries
The Duchy of Lorraine became French following the death in 1766 of Duke Stanisław Leszczyński, and in 1769 Louis XV had the Jesuit Academy transferred to Nancy.  The only notable educational establishment remaining at Pont-à-Mousson was a military training school.

The town continued to flourish as a centre of the visual arts, however, rivalling Épinal to the south in this respect.   A papier-mâché factory also contributed to the cultural development of Pont-à-Mousson.

It was the regional capital between 1790 and 1795, but underwent extensive destruction in the ensuing wars, and was subject to foreign occupation in 1814 and 1815.   During the Franco-Prussian War it experienced severe street fighting.

The Pont-à-Mousson Company was created in 1856 by a group of Lorraine businessmen to operate the Marbache iron mine and to use the ore to manufacture cast iron. Xavier Rogé was the manager. In 1862 the enterprise was liquidated due to lack of sufficient capital to cover the high investment expenses. Rogé managed to raise capital in the Saarland and restart the business, selling most of its production to forges in the Ardennes and Champagne.

In 1866, Rogé visited England and became aware of the new and promising market for cast-iron water pipes. He focused the company on pipe production, and found a ready market when cities began to make large investment in water supply after 1871. He adopted the English method of casting pipes in vertical rather than horizontal moulds. He was succeeded by Camille Cavallier, who transformed the moderately sized cast iron pipe manufacturer into a giant, always concentrating on making pipes. Annual cast iron production rose from 80,000 to 183,000 tons between 1900 and 1913.

The company, later known as Saint-Gobain PAM is still producing ductile cast iron pipes and fittings for drinking water, irrigation and sewage applications. The plant of Pont-à-Mousson, having its 160th anniversary in 2016, is the largest employer in the city, with an average 1000 employees spread among two plants, a research center and the headquarters of the company.

20th century
Strategically positioned at an important river crossing, Pont-à-Mousson and the surrounding region saw terrible fighting during the twentieth century wars between France and Germany.  In the World War I fighting at Bois-le-Prêtre, Croix des Carmes, and Grand-Couronné are names that recall savage fighting between French and German soldiers. The town suffered further destruction in 1944, before being liberated by the U.S. Third Army under the command of Lieutenant General George S. Patton, supported by an active local resistance movement.

In 1921 the President personally presented the town with the Croix de guerre, and shortly after this Désiré Ferry, the local deputy, was awarded the Légion d'honneur.   After World War II, Pont-à-Mousson was again honoured, this time with the Croix de Guerre.

People
Pont-à-Mousson was the birthplace of:
 Guarinus of Sitten (1065–1150), saint and bishop of Sion
 Margaret of Anjou (1430–1482) married to Henry VI of England
 John Barclay (1582—1621), Scottish satirist and Latin poet
 Geraud Duroc (1772–1813), French general
 Louis Camille Maillard (1878–1936), French physician and chemist
 Émile Amann (1880–1948), French historian of religion
 Pierre Lallement, inventor of the modern bicycle
 Georges Navel (1904–1993), French writer, first winner of the Prix Sainte-Beuve in 1946

See also
 Communes of the Meurthe-et-Moselle department

References

Sources

External links

 Town's website

Pontamousson
Duchy of Bar